Salih Altın (born 17 July 1987 in Mulheim an der Ruhr) is a German football player, who is currently playing for Duisburger FV 08.

Career
Altın played in youth for Rot-Weiß Oberhausen, SG Wattenscheid 09 and FC Schalke 04. In 2006 he moved to the reserve team of Wuppertaler SV. After he had only played one game for Wuppertaler SV by December 2007, he was loaned to VfB Lübeck for six months. For the 2008/09 season he returned to Wuppertaler SV, where he made his first professional appearance on August 30 2008 when he came on as a substitute in a game against 1. FC Union Berlin.  After Wuppertaler SV didn't manage to stay in the 3. Liga in the 2009/10 season, Altın left the club. 

After the end of his contract in Wuppertaler, Altin was about to join TFF First League club Eskişehirspor. However, after he had already started training in Turkey, the change finally burst and Altin became without a club. He kept himself fit with the association of contract footballers and the second team of Fortuna Düsseldorf. From January 2011, Altin played for VfB Speldorf. In the summer 2012, Altin moved to VfB Lübeck in the Regionalliga Nord. After half a year the contract was terminated because the club had filed for bankruptcy.

In 2013 Altin played for FSV Duisburg until the end of 2016. On 1 July 2017, he joined SV Genc Osman Duisburg. On 4 May 2020 it was confirmed, that he would play for Duisburger FV 08 from the 2020/21 season.

Notes

External links

 Salih Altın Interview

1987 births
Living people
German footballers
German people of Turkish descent
FC Schalke 04 players
Association football defenders
Wuppertaler SV players
SG Wattenscheid 09 players
Sportspeople from Mülheim
Rot-Weiß Oberhausen players
VfB Lübeck players
3. Liga players
Association football midfielders
Footballers from North Rhine-Westphalia